Hawkesbury Lane was a small railway station on the Coventry to Nuneaton Line, which served the village of Hawkesbury, just north of Coventry and south of Bedworth. It opened along with the line in 1850, and was closed in 1965 when passenger services on the route were withdrawn.

The station was located just north of the still existing level crossing on Black Horse Road, and had unusually low platforms.

In a document by West Midlands Rail Executive it was proposed that Hawkesbury could reopen to passengers as part of a long term 30 year strategy for the West Midlands. It was proposed for reopening between 2034 and 2047.

References

 Hurst, Geoffrey (1993). LNWR Branch Lines of West Leicestershire & East Warwickshire (First ed.). Milepost Publications. .

External links
 Hawkesbury Lane Station on Warwickshire Railways.com

Disused railway stations in Warwickshire
Beeching closures in England
Railway stations in Great Britain opened in 1850
Railway stations in Great Britain closed in 1965
Former London and North Western Railway stations